Hengyang railway station is a railway station in Zhuhui District, Hengyang, Hunan, China.

History 
The station was built with the Guangzhou–Hankou railway, now part of the Beijing–Guangzhou railway.

On 1 September 2017, a renovation project was started. It saw lifts and escalators installed and platform heights increased. The project was completed on 29 June 2018.

Future 
There are proposals to close the station and surrounding lines and transfer passenger services to Hengyang East.

References 

Railway stations in Hunan